The North Macedonia men's national volleyball team is the national volleyball team of North Macedonia.

History
The Macedonian Volleyball Federation was established in 1946 in the framework of physical culture Association of Macedonia. On the 13 February 1949 the Macedonian volleyball federation has become an independent sports organization. North Macedonia has anticipated in five European Leagues and won the silver medal 3 times, and the bronze medal once.

The national team competed successfully in the European League in the last 10 years fighting for the top spots. They finished second 4 times and third once. The Macedonian team qualified twice for the European Championship 2019 and 2021. They played well in tough groups against top European opponents.
Best players of the team in this period are Georgiev Ljaftov and Madjunkov. Although its team spirit and compact covering on all spots are the keys to success of the national team. They cover each other and work hard for every point. 
European Championship 2023 Hosts 
The national team is the host of Volleyball's EURO 2023. Skopje's BTSC -arena the home ground of the national team is venue for the Pool C teams :Denmark, Holland ,Poland ,Montenegro ,Czechia and Macedonia.

European League
The team is focused on competing in the European League. The goal is to make a team for European Championship Qualifiers that will be able to qualify for the European Volleyball Championship. The project started in the beginning of 2010 by the national volleyball federation in order to get the smaller sports like volleyball on a higher level. The National team played 6 semi-finals in the European league winning 4 silver and 2 bronze medals.

Home ground

The BTSC – Boris Trajkovski Sports Center , Skopje is a multi-functional indoor sports arena. It is located in the Karpoš Municipality of Skopje, Macedonia. It is named after the former president, Boris Trajkovski. Its capacity is 10,000. There is an Olympic size Swimming Pool and 5 Star Hotel Alexander Palace within the complex and an additional Water Land Fun Park and Ice Skating Rink next to it. 

The arena is a home-ground of the Macedonian volleyball team (men and women). The venue also contains four restaurants and a sports bar. It was the venue for the European League in 2018 and 2021.
The arena is hosting the European Volleyball Championship 2023 .It is the venue for the Pool C.

European League 
2014 –  3rd place
2015 –  2nd place
2016 –  2nd place
2017 –  2nd place
2018 –  4th place – Silver League
2021 –  2nd place – Silver League
2022 –  3rd place – Silver League

European Championship  
Within  Yugoslavia team
1951(5),1955(5),1958(7),1963(7),1967(7)
1971(11),1975 ,1977(7),1979 ,1981(10)
1985(11),1987(8),1989(8),1991(6)
    2019 – 17th place
    2021 – 23rd place
 2023-Host

World Championship  
Within  Yugoslavia team
1956(10),1962(8),1966(8),1970(10)
Macedonia  1991-2020 didn't enter

Olympic Games  
Within  Yugoslavia team
1980 sixth place
Macedonia  1992-2020 didn't enter

Current team
Updated: September 2019

Roster for 2021 Men's European Volleyball Championship.

Macedonian players in Notable Squads
1975 European Championship
Vladimir Bogoevski 

1979 European Championship
 Goran Srbinovski, Aleksandar Tasevski, Vladimir Bogoevski 

1980 Olympic Games
Vladimir Bogoevski, Goran Srbinovski, Aleksandar Tasevski

External links
FIVB profile
CEV Profile

National men's volleyball teams
Volleyball
Men's sport in North Macedonia
Volleyball in North Macedonia